Pterotopteryx koreana is a moth of the family Alucitidae. It was described by Bong-Kyu Byun in 2006 and is endemic to Gangwon Province, South Korea, Korea.

References

Moths described in 2006
Endemic fauna of Korea
Moths of Asia
Alucitidae